The 1981 Winnipeg Blue Bombers finished in 2nd place in the West Division with an 11–5 record. They appeared in the West Semi-Final but lost 15–11 to the BC Lions.

Offseason

CFL Draft

Preseason

Regular season

Standings

Schedule

Playoffs

West Semi-Final

Awards

1981 CFL All-Stars

References

Winnipeg Blue Bombers seasons
1981 Canadian Football League season by team